Arben Biba (born 1976 in Pristina) is a Kosovo Albanian actor. He is best known for his role as Alban Krasniqi on the Kosovan soap opera Stinë dashurie.

Filmography

Film and Television

See also
 List of Albanian actors

References

External links
 

Date of birth missing (living people)
1976 births
Kosovo Albanians
Kosovan male actors
Kosovan male film actors
21st-century Albanian male actors
Albanian male film actors
Albanian male television actors
Swiss people of Albanian descent
Living people